Oliver Crawford (August 12, 1917 – September 24, 2008) was an American screenwriter and author who overcame the Hollywood blacklist during the McCarthy Era of the 1950s to become one of the entertainment industry's most successful television writers. Shows that Crawford wrote for include Star Trek, Bonanza, Quincy, M.E., Perry Mason, and the Kraft Television Theatre.

Early life 
Born in Chicago, Illinois, Crawford attended the Chicago Art Institute and the Goodman Theatre school. His classmates at Goodman included Sam Wanamaker and Karl Malden, both of whom became his lifelong friends.

Career 
Crawford began working in the television industry as a writer in the early 1950s. By 1953, he had contracted to work with both Harold Hecht and Burt Lancaster. Shortly after he signed his contract to work with Lancaster, Crawford was summoned in 1953 to appear before the House Un-American Activities Committee, which was investigating suspected Communist sympathizers in Hollywood. Crawford refused to name suspected Communists sympathizers within the entertainment industry. His refusal to implicate anyone in Hollywood led to his blacklisting. He was also fired from his 1953 contract. He moved to New York City with his family after being blacklisted where he was forced to take several jobs to make ends meet, including designing window displays.

Crawford was finally able to return to television in 1957 when a friend, actor Sam Levene, got him a job as a writer for Playhouse 90. His career took off during the 1960s, when he wrote for many shows including Gilligan's Island, The Fugitive, The Outer Limits, The Rifleman, The Big Valley, Rawhide, Ben Casey, Lawman, and I Spy. His credits during the 1970s included Love, American Style, The Bionic Woman, Kojak, Mannix, Ironside, and numerous other television shows.

Crawford authored a 1978 novel, The Execution, which explored survivors of a Nazi concentration camp. who recognized a former Nazi doctor who had experimented on them and seek revenge. The novel was adapted into a 1985 television movie of the week, which starred Sandy Dennis, Loretta Swit, Rip Torn, Valerie Harper, Jessica Walter, and Barbara Barrie.

Crawford served on the board of directors of the Writers Guild of America for 26 years following the restoration of his screenwriting career. His position in the Writers Guild allowed him to advocate for financial restitution for victims of the Hollywood blacklist. Crawford also worked to successfully remove an anti-Communist loyalty oath from Writers Guild's membership application, which was a holdover from the Hollywood blacklist era.

For his work, Crawford received a Writers Guild award nomination for The Outer Limits. He was also a multiple Emmy Award nominated television writer, including for Lineup and Climax!. Crawford also lectured as an associate professor of filmmaking at Loyola Marymount University.

Death
On September 24, 2008, Crawford died from complications from pneumonia in Los Angeles at the age of 91. He is survived by two daughters, Jo Kaufman and Vicki Crawford, one brother, and one sister. His wife, Bert (née Pikus) died in 1986. His son, Kenneth Kaufman died in March, 2015.

Filmography

Awards

References

External links
 

 
 The Times: Oliver Crawford: Hollywood writer

1917 births
2008 deaths
Hollywood blacklist
Writers Guild of America board of directors
American male screenwriters
American television writers
20th-century American novelists
Writers from Chicago
Loyola Marymount University faculty
Deaths from pneumonia in California
Writers Guild of America Award winners
American male novelists
American male television writers
20th-century American male writers
Novelists from Illinois
Screenwriters from California
Screenwriters from Illinois
20th-century American screenwriters